Thirty Seconds Over Winterland is an album by the American psychedelic rock band Jefferson Airplane. It was recorded live in August and September 1972, at the Auditorium Theatre in Chicago and the Winterland Ballroom in San Francisco. It was released in April 1973; reflecting the band's declining commercial stature, it only peaked at No. 52 on the Billboard chart.

Recorded during the Long John Silver tour, Thirty Seconds Over Winterland was the band's second live album, after Bless Its Pointed Little Head. The complete final concert of this tour may be heard on the Last Flight CD, released in 2007.

Flying Toasters lawsuit
In 1989, software company Berkeley Systems released its immensely popular After Dark screensaver. The best-known of the various screensaver options was Flying Toasters. Jefferson Airplane sued Berkeley Systems in 1994, claiming that the toasters were a copy of the winged toasters featured on the Thirty Seconds album cover. The band's case was lost because Berkeley claimed no prior knowledge of the artwork, jacket cover art work had to be registered separately from the sound recording, and the judge noted the band had failed to trademark the cover art.

Track listing
Track times from original vinyl release.

Personnel
Personnel credits from original vinyl release.
Jefferson Airplane
Jack Casady – bass
Paul Kantner – vocals, rhythm guitar
Jorma Kaukonen – lead guitar, vocals
Grace Slick – vocals
Papa John Creach – electric violin
John Barbata – drums, percussion
David Freiberg – vocals

Production
Produced and arranged by Jefferson Airplane
Pat "Maurice" Ieraci – production coordinator
Don Gooch – recording engineer
Mallory "Mallory" Earl – mixing engineer
Recorded by Wally Heider's remote unit
Mixed at Wally Heider Studios, San Francisco
Bruce Steinberg – album design, illustration, photography
Randy Tuten – inner sleeve art: photo frames
Greg Irons – inner sleeve art: "Gruntman"
Heavy Water Lights (Joan Chase, Mary Ann Mayer, and John Hardham) – light show
Acy Lehman – art coordination

Charts

Notes

1973 live albums
Grunt Records live albums
Jefferson Airplane live albums
RCA Records live albums